Lee Kyoung-mi (born December 1973) is a South Korean film director and screenwriter.

Career 
Lee Kyoung-mi was born in Seoul, and graduated with a Russian degree from Hankuk University of Foreign Studies. After working at a company for three years, she entered the School of Film, TV & Multimedia of the Korea National University of Arts, graduating with a major in Filmmaking in 2004. Her short film Feel Good Story, about an employee given the task of figuring out how her company can evade paying taxes, garnered several awards in the film festival circuit in 2004.

Lee made her feature directorial debut with Crush and Blush (2008), a black comedy about an obsessive teacher and an outcast student who bond over their shared misanthropy; a critic called it "one of those rare films from an up-and-coming auteur that shows both guts and playfulness." It was the first film to be produced by Park Chan-wook; Lee had previously worked as a scripter/assistant director on Park's 2005 film Sympathy for Lady Vengeance. Crush and Blush premiered at the 13th Busan International Film Festival, and was released in theaters on October 16, 2008. Lee won Best New Director and Best Screenplay at the Blue Dragon Film Awards in 2008.

Lee has also appeared in minor roles in films directed by Ryoo Seung-wan, such as Timeless (2009), The Unjust (2010), and The Berlin File (2013).

Personal life
In 2018, Lee married Pierce Conran, an Irish-Swiss film journalist and producer who has been based in Seoul since 2012.

Filmography

Feature films

Short films

Television

Awards and nominations

Feel Good Story
2004 International Women's Film Festival in Seoul: Grand Prize, People's Choice Award
2004 Mise-en-scène Short Film Festival: Best Film in A City of Sadness
2004 Asiana International Short Film Festival: Grand Prize
2004 Busan Asian Short Film Festival: Camellia Grand Prize

Crush and Blush
2008 Blue Dragon Film Awards: Best New Director, Best Screenplay
2008 Korean Film Awards: Nomination - Best New Director
2008 Women in Film Korea Awards: Best Director/Screenwriter
2009 Baeksang Arts Awards: Nomination - Best New Director

The Truth Beneath
36th Korean Association of Film Critics Awards: Best Director
25th Buil Film Awards: Nomination - Best Director, Best New Director
17th Busan Film Critics Awards: Best Film
2016 Women in Film Korea Awards: Best Screenwriter
2016 Festival du Film Coréen à Paris (FFCP): Audience Award
22nd Chunsa Film Art Awards: Best Screenplay

References

External links
 
 
 

South Korean film directors
South Korean women film directors
South Korean screenwriters
1973 births
Living people
People from Seoul
Hankuk University of Foreign Studies alumni
Korea National University of Arts alumni